The 1974–75 Hertha BSC season started on 24 August 1974 against Fortuna Düsseldorf and finished on 14 June 1975 against VfL Bochum.

Review and events

Match results

Legend

Bundesliga

1.Hertha BSC goals first.
2.Hertha BSC were thevisiting club despite playing in their home stadium.
3.Originally scheduled as the 17th match. The match originally scheduled for 16th Match was rescheduled and played in between the 16th match and 18th match; making it the 17th match.

DFB-Pokal

Squad information

Squad and statistics

Sources: 

|}

Transfers

In

Out

Sources

Match reports

Other sources

Hertha BSC
Hertha BSC seasons